The Girl of the Golden West is a 1923 American silent Western film directed and produced by Edwin Carewe and starring Sylvia Breamer, J. Warren Kerrigan, and Russell Simpson. It was distributed through Associated First National Pictures. It is based on the 1905 David Belasco play The Girl of the Golden West.

Plot summary

Cast

Preservation
With no prints of The Girl of the Golden West located in any film archives, it is a lost film.

References

External links
 
 
 
 
 Sheet music cover and glass slide
 Lobby poster
 Glass slide
 Lantern slide at silenthollywood.com

1923 films
Lost Western (genre) films
American films based on plays
Films directed by Edwin Carewe
1923 Western (genre) films
American black-and-white films
Remakes of American films
Lost American films
1923 lost films
Silent American Western (genre) films
1920s American films
1920s English-language films